Anny – Story of a Prostitute is a 1912 Norwegian drama film written and directed by Adam Eriksen, starring Julie Jansen-Fuhr and Johan Andersson.

Plot 
Factory girl Anny (Jansen-Fuhr) gets involved with an older merchant, and then develops a plot to defraud him with his son. The two are caught and decide to escape to America, but the son then tries to take his own life with poison. He survives and is forgiven, while Anny descends further into poverty and desperation.

Cast 
 Julie Jansen-Fuhr as Anny
 Johan Andersson as Willmann, the merchant
 Gunlaug Lund as the merchant's wife 
 Waldermar Zwinge as the merchant's son
 Eugène Bech as Snapp, the cashier 
 Aagot Gunderson as Anny's friend
 Fru Zwinge as Anny's mother
 Ole Brun Lie as Anny's father
 Kolbjørn Skjefstad as the doctor / the bookkeeper) / a store customer
 Betzy Holter 
 Jens Holstead

External links
 
 Anny – en gatepiges roman at Filmweb.no (Norwegian)

1912 films
1912 drama films
Norwegian black-and-white films
Norwegian silent films
Norwegian drama films
Silent drama films
1910s Norwegian-language films